Venator is an unincorporated community in Harney County, Oregon, United States.

Alphena Venator, a native of Linn County, settled in Harney County as a youth in 1872. Alphena's father Jezreel is the namesake for Venator Canyon in Harney and Malheur counties. When Alphena established a livestock ranch in the area in 1884, the locale soon became known as "Venator". Venator post office was established in 1895, with Louella Venator as the first postmaster. The office was later moved two and a half miles north to a station on the now-abandoned Oregon Eastern Branch (or Burns Branch) of the Union Pacific railroad. As of 1976, there were only six buildings and a corral at the site, although at one time there was a Civilian Conservation Corps (CCC) camp in the area.

References

External links
History of the Oregon Eastern Branch from Abandonedrails.com
History of the Burns Branch from High Desert Rails

Civilian Conservation Corps in Oregon
Unincorporated communities in Harney County, Oregon
1895 establishments in Oregon
Populated places established in 1895
Unincorporated communities in Oregon